Opistognathus is a genus of fish in the family Opistognathidae found in the Atlantic, Indian and Pacific Ocean.

Species
There are currently 68 recognized species in this genus:
 Opistognathus adelus Smith-Vaniz, 2010 (Obscure jawfish) 
 Opistognathus afer Smith-Vaniz, 2010 (African jawfish) 
 Opistognathus albicaudatus Smith-Vaniz, 2011 (White-tail jawfish) 
 Opistognathus alleni Smith-Vaniz, 2004 (Abrolhos jawfish)
 Opistognathus annulatus (Eibl-Eibesfeldt & Klausewitz, 1961)
 Opistognathus aurifrons (D. S. Jordan & J. C. Thompson, 1905) (Yellow-head jawfish)
 Opistognathus brasiliensis Smith-Vaniz, 1997 (Dark-fin jawfish)
 Opistognathus brochus W. A. Bussing & Lavenberg, 2003
 Opistognathus castelnaui Bleeker, 1860 (Castelnau's jawfish)
 Opistognathus crassus Smith-Vaniz, 2010 (Stout jawfish) 
 Opistognathus cuvierii Valenciennes, 1836 (Bar-tail jawfish)
 Opistognathus cyanospilotus Smith-Vaniz, 2009 (Blue-blotch jawfish)
 Opistognathus darwiniensis W. J. Macleay, 1878 (Darwin jawfish)
 Opistognathus decorus Smith-Vaniz & Yoshino, 1985
 Opistognathus dendriticus (D. S. Jordan & R. E. Richardson, 1908) (Dendtric jawfish)
 Opistognathus dipharus Smith-Vaniz, 2010 (Tail-beacon jawfish) 
 Opistognathus elizabethensis Smith-Vaniz, 2004 (Elizabeth Reef jawfish)
 Opistognathus ensiferus Smith-Vaniz, 2016 
 Opistognathus evermanni (D. S. Jordan & Snyder, 1902)
 Opistognathus eximius (J. D. Ogilby, 1908) (Harlequin jawfish)
 Opistognathus fenmutis Acero P & Franke, 1993
 Opistognathus fossoris W. A. Bussing & Lavenberg, 2003
 Opistognathus galapagensis G. R. Allen & D. R. Robertson, 1991 (Galapagos jawfish)
 Opistognathus gilberti J. E. Böhlke, 1967 (Yellow jawfish)
 Opistognathus hongkongiensis W. L. Y. Chan, 1968
 Opistognathus hopkinsi (D. S. Jordan & Snyder, 1902)
 Opistognathus inornatus E. P. Ramsay & J. D. Ogilby, 1887 (Black jawfish)
 Opistognathus iyonis (D. S. Jordan & W. F. Thompson, 1913)
 Opistognathus jacksoniensis W. J. Macleay, 1881 (Jawfish)
 Opistognathus latitabundus (Whitley, 1937) (Blotched jawfish)
 Opistognathus leprocarus Smith-Vaniz, 1997 (Rough-cheek jawfish)
 Opistognathus liturus Smith-Vaniz & Yoshino, 1985
 Opistognathus lonchurus D. S. Jordan & C. H. Gilbert, 1882 (Moustache jawfish)
 Opistognathus longinaris Smith-Vaniz, 2010 (Long-nostril jawfish) 
 Opistognathus macrognathus Poey, 1860 (Banded jawfish)
 Opistognathus macrolepis W. K. H. Peters, 1866 (Big-scale jawfish)
 Opistognathus margaretae Smith-Vaniz, 1983 (Half-scaled jawfish)
 Opistognathus maxillosus Poey, 1860 (Mottled jawfish)
 Opistognathus megalepis Smith-Vaniz, 1972 (Large-scale jawfish)
 Opistognathus melachasme Smith-Vaniz, 1972 (Yellow-mouth jawfish)
 Opistognathus mexicanus G. R. Allen & D. R. Robertson, 1991 (Mexican jawfish)
 Opistognathus muscatensis Boulenger, 1888 (Robust jawfish)
 Opistognathus nigromarginatus Rüppell, 1830 (Birdled jawfish)
 Opistognathus nothus Smith-Vaniz, 1997
 Opistognathus panamaensis G. R. Allen & D. R. Robertson, 1991 (Panamanian jawfish)
 Opistognathus papuensis Bleeker, 1868 (Papuan jawfish)
 Opistognathus pardus Smith-Vaniz, Bineesh & Akhilesh, 2012 (Leopard jawfish) 
 Opistognathus punctatus W. K. H. Peters, 1869 (Fine-spotted jawfish)
 Opistognathus randalli Smith-Vaniz, 2009 (Gold-specs jawfish)
 Opistognathus reticeps Smith-Vaniz, 2004 
 Opistognathus reticulatus (McKay, 1969) (Reticulated jawfish)
 Opistognathus rhomaleus D. S. Jordan & C. H. Gilbert, 1882 (Giant jawfish)
 Opistognathus robinsi Smith-Vaniz, 1997 (Spot-fin jawfish)
 Opistognathus rosenbergii Bleeker, 1856 (Rosenberg's jawfish)
 Opistognathus rosenblatti G. R. Allen & D. R. Robertson, 1991 (Blue-spotted jawfish)
 Opistognathus rufilineatus Smith-Vaniz & G. R. Allen, 2007 (Red-lined jawfish) 
 Opistognathus scops (O. P. Jenkins & Evermann, 1889) (Bulls-eye jawfish)
 Opistognathus seminudus Smith-Vaniz, 2004 (Half-naked jawfish)
 Opistognathus signatus Smith-Vaniz, 1997
 Opistognathus simus Smith-Vaniz, 2010 (Cargados jawfish) 
 Opistognathus smithvanizi W. A. Bussing & Lavenberg, 2003
 Opistognathus solorensis Bleeker, 1853 (Solor jawfish) 
 Opistognathus stigmosus Smith-Vaniz, 2004 (Coral Sea jawfish)
 Opistognathus trimaculatus Hiramatsu & Endo, 2013 (Five-banded jawfish) 
 Opistognathus variabilis Smith-Vaniz, 2009 (Variable jawfish)
 Opistognathus verecundus Smith-Vaniz, 2004 (Bashful jawfish)
 Opistognathus walkeri W. A. Bussing & Lavenberg, 2003
 Opistognathus whitehursti (Longley, 1927) (Dusky jawfish)

References

 
Opistognathidae
Marine fish genera
Taxa named by Georges Cuvier